Usman Siddiqui is an Indian sculptor. He hails from the city of Hyderabad.

Career

Usman Siddiqui has been a popular sculptor in Hyderabad. He is preferred by the local Nawabs.

References

Indian male sculptors
Living people
Indian Muslims
Year of birth missing (living people)
Artists from Andhra Pradesh
20th-century Indian sculptors
20th-century Indian male artists